Zvjezdan Cvetković (18 April 1960 – 27 February 2017) was a Croatian football manager and player.

International career
He made his debut for Yugoslavia in a November 1982 European Championship qualification match away against Bulgaria, coming on as a 69th-minute substitute for Slavoljub Nikolić, and earned a total of 9 caps, scoring 1 goal. His final international was an August 1987 friendly against the Soviet Union.

Personal life
His younger brother Borislav Cvetković was also Yugoslavian national team player.

Death
Cvetković was found dead in his garage in Kostanjevac, Zagreb, in February 2017. According to unofficial information, he died of natural causes.

References

External links
 
Player profile on Yugoslavia / Serbian National Team page

1960 births
2017 deaths
Sportspeople from Karlovac
Serbs of Croatia
Association football defenders
Yugoslav footballers
Yugoslavia international footballers
GNK Dinamo Zagreb players
SV Waldhof Mannheim players
Yugoslav First League players
Bundesliga players
Yugoslav expatriate footballers
Expatriate footballers in West Germany
Yugoslav expatriate sportspeople in West Germany
Croatian football managers
Serbia and Montenegro football managers
Serbian football managers
GNK Dinamo Zagreb managers
FK Borac Banja Luka managers
Croatian Football League managers
Premier League of Bosnia and Herzegovina managers
Serbia and Montenegro expatriate football managers
Expatriate football managers in Croatia
Serbia and Montenegro expatriate sportspeople in Croatia
Serbian expatriate football managers
Expatriate football managers in Bosnia and Herzegovina
Serbian expatriate sportspeople in Bosnia and Herzegovina